The Communist Party of Vietnam (CPV), also known as the Vietnamese Communist Party (VCP), is the founding and sole legal party of the Socialist Republic of Vietnam. Founded in 1930 by Hồ Chí Minh, the CPV became the ruling party of North Vietnam in 1954 and then all of Vietnam after the collapse of the South Vietnamese government following the Fall of Saigon in 1975. Although it nominally exists alongside the Vietnamese Fatherland Front, it maintains a unitary government and has centralized control over the state, military, and media. The supremacy of the CPV is guaranteed by Article 4 of the national constitution. The Vietnamese public generally refer to the CPV as simply "the Party" or "our Party".

The CPV is organized on the basis of democratic centralism, a principle conceived by Russian Marxist revolutionary Vladimir Lenin. The highest institution of the CPV is the party's National Congress, which elects the Central Committee. The Central Committee is the supreme organ on party affairs in between party congresses. After a party congress, the Central Committee elects the Politburo and Secretariat, and appoints the First Secretary, the highest party office. In between sessions of the Central Committee, the Politburo is the supreme organ on party affairs. However, it can only implement decisions based on the policies which have been approved in advance by either the Central Committee or the party's National Congress. , the 12th Politburo has 19 members. The current party leader is Nguyễn Phú Trọng, who holds the titles of General Secretary of the Central Committee and Secretary of the Central Military Commission.

The CPV is committed to communism and participates in the annual International Meeting of Communist and Workers' Parties. The party is also known for its advocacy of what it calls a "socialist-oriented market economy", as well as Hồ Chí Minh Thought, which combines Marxism–Leninism, Vietnamese philosophy, ideas from the French Revolution, and Hồ Chí Minh's personal beliefs.

The party aligned with the Soviet Union and its allies during the Cold War.

History

Rise to power (1925–1945) 
The Communist Party of Vietnam traces its history back to 1925, when Hồ Chí Minh established the Vietnamese Revolutionary Youth League, commonly shortened to the Youth League. The Youth League's goal was to end the colonial occupation of Vietnam by France. The group sought political and social objectives—national independence and the redistribution of land to working peasants. The Youth League's purpose was to prepare the masses for a revolutionary armed struggle against the French occupation. His efforts in laying the groundwork for the party was financially supported by the Comintern.

In 1928 the headquarters of the Youth League in Canton (present-day Guangdong), China, were destroyed by the Kuomintang (Chinese Nationalist Party) and the group was forced underground. This led to a national breakdown within the Youth League, which indirectly led to a split. On 17 June 1929, more than 20 delegates from cells throughout the Tonkin (northern) region held a conference in Hanoi, where they declared the dissolution of Youth League and the establishment of a new organization called the Communist Party of Indochina. The other faction of the Youth League, based in the Cochinchina (southern) region of the country, held a conference in Saigon and declared themselves the Communist Party of Annam in late 1929. The two parties spent the rest of 1929 engaged in polemics against one another in an attempt to gain a position of hegemony over the radical Vietnamese liberation movement. A third Vietnamese communist group which did not originate from the Youth League emerged around this time in the Annam (central) region, calling itself the Communist League of Indochina. The Communist League of Indochina had its roots in another national liberation group which had existed in parallel with the Youth League, and saw itself as a rival to the latter.

The Communist Party of Indochina and Communist Party of Annam, together with individual members of the Communist League of Indochina, merged to form a united communist organization called the Communist Party of Vietnam, founded by Hồ Chí Minh at a "Unification Conference" held in Wah Yan College in Kowloon, Hong Kong, from 3–7 February 1930. At a later conference, per the request of the Comintern, the party changed its name to the Indochinese Communist Party, often abbreviated as ICP. During its first five years of existence, the ICP attained a membership of about 1,500 and had a large contingent of sympathizers. Despite the group's small size, it exerted an influence in a turbulent Vietnamese social climate. Poor harvests in 1929 and 1930 and an onerous burden of debt served to radicalize many peasants. In the industrial city of Vinh, May Day demonstrations were organized by ICP activists, which gained critical mass when the families of the semi-peasant workers joined the demonstrations to express their dissatisfaction with the economic circumstances they faced.

As three May Day marches grew into mass rallies, French colonial authorities moved in to quash what they perceived to be dangerous peasant revolts. Government forces fired upon the crowds, killing dozens and enraging the population. In response, councils were organized in villages in an effort to govern themselves locally. Repression by the colonial authorities began in the autumn of 1931; around 1,300 people were eventually killed by the French and many more were imprisoned or deported as government authority was reasserted and the ICP was effectively wiped out in the region. General Secretary Tran Phu and a number of Central Committee members were arrested or killed. Lê Hồng Phong was assigned by the Comintern to restore the movement. The party was restored in 1935, and Lê Hồng Phong was elected its general secretary. In 1936, Hà Huy Tập was appointed general secretary instead of Lê Hồng Phong, who returned to the country to restore the Central Committee. In the mid 1930s the party was forced publicly to abandon much of its opposition to French colonialism as Soviet leader Joseph Stalin cared more about strengthening a left-inclined government in France. Hồ Chí Minh was also removed from the party leadership in the early 1930s.

The French colonial apparatus in Vietnam was disrupted during World War II. The fall of France to Nazi Germany in June 1940 and the subsequent collaboration of Vichy France with the Axis powers of Germany and Japan served to delegitimize French claims of sovereignty. The European war made colonial governance from France impossible and Indochina was occupied by Japanese forces. As a result, the communists also sought the opportunity to establish a grassroots organization throughout most of the country.

At the beginning of the war, the ICP instructed its members to go into hiding in the countryside. Despite this, more than 2,000 party members, including many of its leaders, were rounded up and arrested. Party activists were particularly hard hit in the southern region of Cochinchina, where the previously strong organization was wiped out by arrests and killings. After an uprising in Cochinchina in 1940, most of the Central Committee, including Nguyễn Văn Cừ (general secretary) and Hà Huy Tập, were arrested and killed, and Lê Hồng Phong was deported to Côn Đảo and later died. A new party leadership, which included Trường Chinh, Phạm Văn Đồng, and Võ Nguyên Giáp emerged. Together with Hồ Chí Minh, these individuals would provide a unified leadership over the next four decades.

Hồ Chí Minh returned to Vietnam in February 1941 and established a military-political front known as the League for the Independence of Vietnam, commonly known as the Viet Minh. The Viet Minh was a broad organization that included many political parties, military groups, religious organizations and other factions who sought independence for Vietnam. The Viet Minh was heavily influenced by the leadership of the ICP. It was the most uncompromising fighting force against the Japanese occupation and gained popular recognition and legitimacy in an environment that would become a political vacuum. Despite its position as the core of the Viet Minh, the ICP remained very small throughout the war, with an estimated membership of between 2,000 and 3,000 in 1944.

Left opposition
The party, particularly in the south, was rivalled by other nationalist and left-wing groups, notably Trotskyist organisations. In November 1931, dissidents emerging from within the party formed the October Left Opposition around the clandestine journal  (October). These included Hồ Hữu Tường and Phan Văn Hùm who, protesting a leadership of "Moscow trainees", had formed an Indochinese group within the Communist League, the French section of the International Left Opposition, in Paris in July 1930. Once considered "the theoretician of the Vietnamese contingent in Moscow", Tường was calling for a new "mass-based" party arising directly "out of the struggle of the real struggle of the proletariat of the cities and countryside". Tường was joined in endorsing Leon Trotsky's doctrines of "proletarian internationalism" and of "permanent revolution" by Tạ Thu Thâu of the Annamite Independence Party. Rejecting (in the wake of the Shanghai massacre) the Comintern's "Kuomintang line", Thâu argued against a nationalist accommodation with the indigenous bourgeoisie and for immediate "proletarian socialist revolution."

Recognizing the Trotskyists' relative strength in organizing Saigon's factories and waterfront, the ICP cells in the city maintained a unique pact with the Trotskyists for four years in the mid-1930s. The two groups published a common paper, La Lutte ("The Struggle"), and presented joint "workers' lists" for Saigon municipal and colonial-council elections. After they rallied in August 1945 with other non-Communist forces demanding arms against the French, the Trotskyists were systematically hunted down and eliminated by their former party collaborators under the direction of Tran Van Giau, a fate shared by large numbers of Caodaists, independent nationalists and their families.

First Indochina War (1945–1954) 
Following the August Revolution, Hồ Chí Minh became Chairman of the Provisional Government (Prime Minister of the Democratic Republic of Vietnam) and issued a Proclamation of Independence of the Democratic Republic of Vietnam. Although he convinced Emperor Bảo Đại to abdicate, his government was not recognized by any country. He repeatedly petitioned American President Harry S. Truman for support for Vietnamese independence, citing the Atlantic Charter, but Truman did not respond. After the successful establishment of an independent Democratic Republic of Vietnam in Hanoi, Vietnam was taken over by Chinese nationalist forces in the north and the French-British joint forces in the south.

In response to French attempts to sow disunity within the Viet Minh, the ICP was officially dissolved and was downgraded to the "Institute for Studying Marxism in Indochina". This symbolic gesture was intended to encourage unity between Vietnamese communists and non-communists in their struggle against the French and their sympathizers. In practice, the Viet Minh became the leading force in the struggle for Vietnamese independence. The ICP was ostensibly dissolved, but its core was still functioning. According to the United States' Central Intelligence Agency (CIA), membership in the Viet Minh grew to about 400,000 members by 1950. In 1951, during the war for independence, the officially dissolved Indochinese Communist Party was officially re-established and renamed the Worker's Party of Vietnam, often abbreviated as the WPV. The Indochinese War against French forces lasted until the Vietnamese victory at the Battle of Điện Biên Phủ in 1954.

Vietnam was partitioned following the 1954 Geneva Conference, with the communists ruling the northern half of the country. Almost immediately, the party's Marxist ideologues believed that their party had lost sight of its real Marxist purpose of guiding the working class in a struggle against the bourgeoisie in its efforts of national independence. By 1955, they had launched a significant campaign to promote personnel with a background in class struggle, at the cost of communists whose claims to authority were based on their leadership in the resistance against the French.

Vietnam War (1955–1975) 
At the second party congress it was decided that the Communist Party would be split into three; one party for each of Vietnam, Laos and Cambodia. However, in an official note it said that the "Vietnamese party reserves the right to supervise the activities of its brother parties in Cambodia and Laos". The Khmer People's Revolutionary Party was established in April 1951 and the Lao People's Party was formed four years later on 22 March 1955. The third party congress, held in Hanoi in 1960, formalized the tasks of constructing socialism in what was by then North Vietnam, or the Democratic Republic of Vietnam (DRV), and committed the party to the "liberation" of South Vietnam. In the south, the United States helped establish an anti-communist state, the Republic of Vietnam (RVN), in 1955. In 1960 the DRV established a military-political front in the south called the National Liberation Front of Southern Vietnam or NLF for short. American soldiers commonly referred to the NLF as the Viet Cong or VC for short.

The Vietnam War (or Second Indochina War) broke out between the communists which included the Democratic Republic of Vietnam (North Vietnam) and the National Liberation Front (Viet Cong), and the anti-communists which included the United States, the Republic of Vietnam (South Vietnam) and their allies, such as Australia, South Korea, and Thailand. The communists received support from the People's Republic of China and the Soviet Union. The war lasted from 1960 to 1975 and spilled over into Laos and Cambodia. The Cambodian Civil War broke out between the communist Khmer Rouge and GRUNK, and the pro-American Khmer Republic. The Laotian Civil War broke out between the communist Pathet Lao and the pro-American Kingdom of Laos. The Cambodian and Laotian communists received training and support from the DRV and NLF. During the war the Worker's Party of Vietnam also established its sub-branch in the south called the People's Revolutionary Party of South Vietnam, which aimed to lead the NLF. After the withdrawal of American troops from Indochina and the collapse of the RVN on 30 April 1975, Vietnam was unified under the leadership of the communists. At the fourth party congress in 1976, the Workers' Party of Vietnam merged with the People's Revolutionary Party of South Vietnam to create the Communist Party of Vietnam, commonly abbreviated as CPV. The party explained that the merger and name change was made in light of the "strengthened proletariat dictatorship, the development of the leadership of the working class... a worker-peasant alliance".

Ruling party (1976–present) 

The fourth party congress comprised 1,008 delegates who represented 1,553,500 party members, an estimated three per cent of the Vietnamese population. A new line for socialist construction was approved at the congress, the Second Five-Year Plan (1976–1980) was approved and several amendments were made to the party's constitution. The party's new line emphasized building socialism domestically and supported socialist expansion internationally. The party's economic goal was to build a strong and prosperous socialist country in 20 years. The economic goals set for the Second Five-Year Plan failed to be implemented, and a heated debate about economic reform took place between the fourth and fifth party congresses. The first was at the sixth Central Committee plenum of the fourth party congress in September 1979, but the most revealing one occurred at the tenth Central Committee plenum of the fourth party congress which lasted form 9 October to 3 November 1981. The plenum adopted a reformist line but was forced to moderate its position when several grassroot party chapters rebelled against its resolution. At the fifth party congress, held in March 1982, General Secretary Lê Duẩn said the party had to strive to reach two goals; to construct socialism and to protect Vietnam from Chinese aggression, but priority was given to socialist construction. The party leadership acknowledged the failures of the Second Five-Year Plan, claiming that their failure to grasp the economic and social conditions aggravated the country's economic problems. The Third Five-Year Plan (1981–1985) emphasized the need to improve living conditions and the need for more industrial construction, but agriculture was given top priority. Other points were to improve the deficiencies in central planning, improve economic trade relations with the COMECON countries, Laos and Kampuchea.

While Lê Duẩn continued to believe in the goals set in the Third Five-Year Plan, leading members within the Communist Party were losing their trust in the system. It was in this mood that the 1985 price reform was introduced—market prices were introduced, which led to a sudden increase in inflation. By 1985, it became apparent that the Third Five-Year Plan had failed miserably. Attacks against the interests of the well-to-do were part of the Communist ideas of class struggle. The majority of the educated came from well-off families, and the middle and upper classes held education and abilities that were critical to the country's prosperity, but the Communist Party's attitude toward those groups has frequently hampered their effective use of their education and skills. As a result, Vietnam's most pressing needs, such as the rebuilding of a shattered economy and the establishment of long-term economic development, had largely gone unfulfilled. The Communist Party's personnel lacked the skills to tackle these issues, and the Communists' monopolization of power made it impossible for those who did have the skills to put them to use in the decade following the war's end. Vietnam was one of the poorest countries in the world during Lê Duẩn's rule. Lê Duẩn died on 10 July 1986, a few months before the sixth party congress. A Politburo meeting held between 25 and 30 August 1986, paved the way for more radical reforms; the new reform movement was led by Trường Chinh. At the sixth party congress, Nguyễn Văn Linh was elected the new general secretarythis was a victory for the party's old guard reformist wing. The new leadership elected at the Congress would later launch Đổi Mới and establish the framework for the socialist-oriented market economy. The economic reforms were initiated alongside a relaxation of state censorship and freedom of expression. The Chinese Communist Party praised the CPV's economic and political reforms, which continued into the early 2000s.

At the seventh party congress in which Nguyễn Văn Linh retired from politics, he reaffirmed the party's and country's commitment to socialism. Đỗ Mười succeeded Nguyễn Văn Linh as general secretary, Võ Văn Kiệt, the leading reformist communist, was appointed prime minister and Lê Đức Anh, was appointed president. In 1994, four new members were appointed to the seventh Politburo, all of whom opposed radical reform. At the June 1997 Central Committee meeting, both Lê Đức Anh and Võ Văn Kiệt confirmed their resignations to the ninth National Assembly, which was dissolved in September. Phan Văn Khải was approved as Võ Văn Kiệt's successor, and the relatively unknown Trần Đức Lương succeeded Lê Đức Anh as president. At the fourth Central Committee plenum of the eighth party congress, Lê Khả Phiêu was elected general secretary and Đỗ Mười, Lê Đức Anh and Võ Văn Kiệt officially resigned from politics and were elected Advisory Council of the Central Committee. Nông Đức Mạnh succeeded Lê Khả Phiêu in 2001 as general secretary. Nông Đức Mạnh held the top spot until the 11th National Congress in 2011, when he was succeeded by Nguyễn Phú Trọng.

Organization

National Congress 

The National Congress is the party's highest organ, and is held once every five years. Delegates decide the direction of the party and the Government at the National Congress. The Central Committee is elected, delegates vote on policies and candidates are elected to posts within the central party leadership. After decisions taken at the National Congress are ratified, the congress is dissolved. The Central Committee implements the decisions of the National Congress during the five-year period between congresses. When the Central Committee is not in session, the Politburo implements the policies of the National Congress.

Central Committee 

The Central Committee is the CPV's most powerful institution. It delegates some of its powers to the Secretariat and the Politburo when it is not in session. When the Vietnam War ended in 1975, the Vietnamese leadership, led by Lê Duẩn, began to centralize power. This policy continued until the sixth National Congress, when Nguyễn Văn Linh took power. Linh pursued a policy of economic and political decentralization. The party and state bureaucracy opposed Linh's reform initiatives; because of this, Linh tried to win the support of provincial leaders, causing the powers of the provincial chapters of the CPV to increase in the 1990s. The CPV lost its power to appoint or dismiss provincial-level officials in the 1990s; Võ Văn Kiệt tried to wrestle this power back to the centre during the 1990s without success. These developments led to the provincialization of the Central Committee; for example, increasing numbers of Central Committee members have a background in provincial party work.

Because of these changes, power in Vietnam has become increasingly devolved. The number of Central Committee members with a provincial background increased from 15.6 per cent in 1982 to 41 per cent in 2001. Because of the devolution of power, the powers of the Central Committee have increased substantially; for example, when a two-thirds majority of the Politburo voted in favour of retaining Lê Khả Phiêu as General Secretary, the Central Committee voted against the Politburo's motion and voted unanimously in favour of removing him from his post of General Secretary. The Central Committee did this because most of its members had a provincial background, or were working in the provinces. These members were the first to be affected when the economy began to stagnate during Lê Khả Phiêu's rule. The Central Committee elects the Politburo in the aftermath of the Party Congress.

General Secretary 

The General Secretary of the Central Committee is the highest office within the Communist Party, is elected by the Central Committee, and can remain in post for two five-year terms. The general secretary presides over the work of the Central Committee, the Politburo, the Secretariat, is responsible for issues such as defence, security and foreign affairs, and chairs meetings with important leaders. The general secretary holds the post of Secretary of the Central Military Commission, the party's highest military affairs organ.

Politburo 

The Politburo is the highest organ of the Communist Party between Central Committee meetings, which are held twice a year. The Politburo can implement policies which have been approved by either the previous Party Congress or the Central Committee. It is the duty of the Politburo to ensure that resolutions of the Party Congress and the Central Committee are implemented nationally. It is also responsible for matters related to organization and personnel, and has the right to prepare and convene a Central Committee plenary session. The Politburo can be overruled by the Central Committee, as happened in 2001 when the Politburo voted in favour of retaining Lê Khả Phiêu as general secretary; the Central Committee overturned the Politburo's decision, dismissed Lê from politics, and forced the Politburo to elect a new general secretary after the ninth National Congress.

The members of the Politburo are elected and given a ranking by the Central Committee immediately after a National Party Congress. According to David Koh, the Politburo ranking from the first plenum of the 10th Central Committee onwards is based upon the number of approval votes by the Central Committee. Lê Hồng Anh, the Minister of Public Security, was ranked second in the 10th Politburo because he received the second-highest number of approval votes. Tô Huy Rứa was ranked lowest because he received the lowest approval vote of the 10th Central Committee when he stood for election to the Politburo. The 11th Politburo was elected by the Central Committee after the 11th National Congress and consists of 16 members. Decisions within the Politburo are made through collective decision-making.

Since 10th Central Committee, the duties and responsibilities of the members of the Politburo and those of the General Secretary, President, Prime Minister, the Chairman of the National Assembly and the Permanent member of the Secretariat have been specified separately.

Secretariat 

The Secretariat is headed by the general secretary and decisions within it are made through collective decision-making. The Secretariat is elected and the membership size is decided by the Central Committee immediately after the National Congress. It is responsible for solving organizational problems and implementing the demands of the Central Committee. The Secretariat oversees the work of the Departments of the Central Committee. It is also responsible for inspecting and supervising the implementation of resolutions and directives on fields regarding the party on economic, social, defence, security and foreign affairs, and it is directly responsible for the coordination of a number of party bodies. The Secretariat supervises the preparation for issues raised at Politburo meetings.

Central Military Commission 

The Central Military Commission is appointed by the Politburo and includes members from the military. The commission is responsible to the Central Committee and between meetings, the Politburo and the Secretariat. The Secretary of the Central Military Commission is the party's general secretary while the post of deputy secretary is held by the Minister of National Defence. The commission can issue guidelines on military and defence policies, and has leadership in all aspects of the military. The General Political Department is subordinate to the commission.

Central Inspection Commission 

The Central Inspection Commission is the party organ responsible for combating corruption, disciplining members and wrongdoing in general. It is the only organ within the party which can sentence or condemn party members. The Commission, and its chairman and deputy chairmen, are elected by the first plenum of the Central Committee after a National Party Congress. Due to the party's policy of democratic centralism, a local inspection commission can only investigate a case if the inspection commission directly superior to it consents to the investigation.

Central Theoretical Council 

The Central Theoretical Council was established on 22 October 1996 by a decision of the Central Committee. The 4th Central Theoretical Council was formed on 7 September 2016, and is currently headed by Politburo member Đinh Thế Huynh. It functions as an advisory body to the Central Committee, the Politburo and the Secretariat on conceiving and developing party theory in line with Marxism. It is responsible for studying topics put forth by the Politburo and the Secretariat, and topics set forth by its own members.

Ideology 

Vietnam is a socialist republic with a one-party system led by the Communist Party. The CPV espouses Marxism–Leninism and Hồ Chí Minh Thought, the ideologies of the late Hồ Chí Minh. The two ideologies serve as guidance for the activities of the party and state. According to the Constitution, Vietnam is in a period of transition to socialism. Marxism–Leninism was introduced to Vietnam in the 1920s and 1930s, and Vietnamese culture has been led under the banners of patriotism and Marxism–Leninism. Hồ Chí Minh's beliefs were not systematized during his life, nor did this occur quickly following his death. Trường Chinh's 1973 biography of Hồ emphasized his revolutionary policies. The thoughts of Hồ were systematized in 1989 under the leadership of Nguyễn Văn Linh. Hồ Chí Minh Thought and Marxism–Leninism became the official ideologies of the CPV and the state in 1991. The CPV's claim to legitimacy was retained after the collapse of communism elsewhere in 1989 and the dissolution of the Soviet Union in 1991 by its commitment to the thoughts of Hồ Chí Minh, according to Sophie Quinn-Judge. According to Pierre Brocheux, the current state ideology is Hồ Chí Minh Thought, with Marxism–Leninism playing a secondary role. Some claim that Hồ Chí Minh Thought is used as a veil for a party leadership that has stopped believing in communism, but others rule this out on the basis that Hồ Chí Minh was an avid supporter of Lenin and the dictatorship of the proletariat. Still others see Hồ Chí Minh Thought as a political umbrella term whose main function is to introduce non-socialist ideas and policies without challenging socialist legality.

Marxism–Leninism has lost its monopolistic ideological and moral legitimacy since the introduction of a mixed economy in the late 1980s and 1990s. Because of the Đổi Mới reforms, the party could not base its rule on defending only the workers and the peasants, which was officially referred to as the "working class-peasant alliance". In the constitution introduced in 1992, the State represented the "workers, peasants and intellectuals". In recent years, the party has stopped representing a specific class, but instead the "interests of the entire people", which includes entrepreneurs. The final class barrier was removed in 2006, when party members were allowed to engage in private activities. In the face of de-emphasising the role of Marxism–Leninism, the party has acquired a broader ideology, laying more emphasis on nationalism, developmentalism and becoming the protector of tradition. Minh himself stated that what originally attracted him to Communism was not its doctrines, which he did not at that time understand, but the simple fact that the Communists supported the independence of countries like Vietnam.

Transition to socialism 

According to Hồ Chí Minh, before it becomes socialist, a society must evolve through national liberation and the construction of a people's democratic regime. While national liberation is the means of taking power, the establishment of a people's democratic regime requires the total destruction of the feudalist, colonialist and imperialist society. Only through this destruction can Vietnam transit to socialism. Lai Quoc Khanh, a journalist in the theoretical Tạp chí Cộng Sản wrote: "The people's democratic regime is an objective necessity in the development course of Vietnamese society". A people's democratic regime, however, is not a socialist regime. For instance, in a people's democratic regime private ownership still exists, while in a communist or socialist stage of development, ownership does not exist. Vietnamese communists consider the distribution of land during Hồ Chí Minh's early rule as an example of people's democracy.

However, this is not the only difference. The logic is that difference in the ownership of productions lead to different modes of production. Hồ Chí Minh said that the basic economic tenets of a people's democratic regime was state ownership of certain segments of production—considered socialist since the state belongs to the people, cooperatives, which were half-socialist in nature but would develop into fully socialist economic entities, and the personal economics of individual handicraft and peasantry, which would later develop into cooperatives, private capitalism and state capitalism, where the state shares capital with capitalists to develop the country further. Since these economic basics relied on different types of ownership, the economy of the people's democratic regime cannot be considered socialist, hence the regime is not socialist. For example, in the socialist-oriented market economy, the state-owned sector will be the dominant sector, hence the socialist character of the economy dominates. The political platform of the second party congress held in 1951 stated: "The people's democratic revolution is neither an old-type capitalist democratic revolution nor socialist revolution, it is a new-type capitalist democratic revolution which will evolve into socialist revolution without experiencing a revolutionary civil war." To be more specific, the people's democratic regime is a substage in capitalist development. While Hồ Chí Minh supported the position that Vietnam had entered the stage of transition to socialism in 1954, he held the belief that Vietnam was still "a democratic regime in which people are the masters" and not socialist. To reach the socialist stage of development, the development of the state sector was of utmost importance—the lack of which according to Hồ Chí Minh would lead to failure. The platform of the 11th National Congress held in January 2011 stated: "This is a profound and thorough revolutionary process and a complicated struggle between the old and the new for qualitative changes in all aspects of social life. It is essential to undergo a long period of transition with several steps of development and several mixed social and economic structures".

According to the party's General Secretary Nguyễn Phú Trọng, during the transition to socialism, socialist factors of development compete with non-socialist factors, which include capitalist factors. Nguyễn said: "Along with positive aspects, there will always be negative aspects and challenges that need to be considered wisely and dealt with timely and effectively. It is a difficult struggle that requires spirit, fresh vision, and creativity. The path to socialism is a process of constantly consolidating and strengthening socialist factors to make them more dominant and irreversible. Success will depend on correct policies, political spirit, leadership capacity, and the fighting strength of the Party".

"Superiority of socialism" 

The Communist Party believes that socialism is superior to other ideologies and state systems. According to Marxism–Leninism, socialism is the second-to-last stage of socio-economic development before pure communism. To build a socialist society, communists have to imagine, outline and study society. The party believes that socialism leads to human liberation from every oppressive situation, exploitation and injustice. While the founders of Marxism–Leninism forecasted the main characteristics of a socialist society, the founders are not considered by the party to hold the whole truth. The main outline of this ideology is upheld by the party—that is, a social mode superior and more advanced:
 The highest goal of socialism is to liberate the people from every yoke of exploitation and economic slavery of the spirit, enabling comprehensive human development.
 The facilities of socialism are the forces generated by modern advanced production.
 Socialism is the gradual abolition of private property and capitalism and changes to the means of production.
 Socialism creates labour organizations and a new form labourer with high discipline and productivity.
 Socialism means the implementation of the principle of each according to his contribution.
 State socialism is a new kind of democracy, reflecting the nature of the working class and representing the interests, power and will of the working people.
 In a socialist society, the relationship between class and ethnicity will be resolved through a combination of international and class solidarity—nationalism will be replaced by internationalism.

Socialist-oriented market economy 

Proponents of the socialist-oriented market economy claim that the system is neither socialist nor capitalist, but that it is "socialist-oriented." The Communist Party rejects the view that a market economy has to be capitalist. According to the party, "a socialist market-oriented economy is a multi-sectoral commodity economy, which operates in accordance with market mechanisms and a socialist orientation". According to Nguyễn Phú Trọng, "[i]t is a new type of market economy in the history of the market economy's development. It is a kind of economic organization which abides by market economy rules but is based on, led by, and governed by the principles and nature of socialism reflected in its three aspectsownership, organization, and distributionfor the goal of a prosperous people in a strong nation characterized by democracy, fairness, and civilization". There are multiple forms of ownership in a socialist-oriented market economy. Economic sectors operate in accordance with the law and are equal under the law in the interest of co-existence, cooperation and healthy competition. Nguyễn Phú Trọng said:

Unlike in capitalist countries, a socialist-oriented market economy does not "wait for the economy to reach a high level of development before implementing social progress and fairness, nor 'sacrifice' social progress and fairness to the pursuit of mere economic growth". Policies are enacted for the sole purpose of improving the people's standard of living.

Role of classical Marxism 

Classical Marxist texts still play a prominent role in the Communist Party's ideological development. The Communist Manifesto, written by Karl Marx and Friedrich Engels, is considered an "immortal work". According to the party, the real value of The Communist Manifesto is not that it can provide answers to present revolutionary problems, but the way it explains the gradual liberation of the working class and labourers. It functions as a basis for the most basic theoretical beliefs upheld by the party. According to Tô Huy Rứa, currently a member of the 11th Politburo: "By participating in the process of globalization complete with its opportunities and challenges, as was predicted by Marx and Engels in the Manifesto, the Vietnamese Communist Party and people will further find guidelines for a precious world outlook and methodologies. Sustainable values of this immortal theoretical work and political platform will remain forever". Trần Bạch Đằng wrote:

Criticism 
In spite of Vietnam's 1986 economic reform, many left-wing critics have criticized Vietnam's current ideology. Outspoken dissident leftist Bui Tin said that "the Communist Party [of Vietnam] is full of opportunists and privileged elites. The morality is lost. All is the search for dollars." Critics of the CPV have argued that the socialist-oriented market economy is a re-capitalized system which allows massive capitalist markets, bourgeoisie, and foreign investments while expanding economic inequality and social unrest.

Party-to-party relations 

In a resolution of the 10th National Party Congress, it was decided to renovate and strengthen the party's foreign policy. , the Commission for External Relations of the Central Committee has good relations with 222 political parties in 115 countries. According to the party, this is an "important contributions to accelerating the renovation process, industrialization and modernization of Vietnam". The party does not only have foreign relations with communist parties; relations with non-communist parties have been established because their countries are economically important to Vietnam. Relations with other communist and workers' parties are very important and built on "solidarity, friendship, mutual support in the struggle for socialism in the spirit of Marxism-Leninism and pure internationalism of the working class". It exchanges views with such parties on theoretical and practical issues regarding socialist construction, party building and current problems. The CPV is active in international communist and workers party gatherings, such as the International Meeting of Communist and Workers' Parties.

The CPV currently maintains relations with over 100 communist and workers' parties. The party has emphasized the importance of relations with the Lao People's Revolutionary Party and the Cambodian People's Party. It also maintains good relations with the Chinese Communist Party, the Communist Party of Cuba, and the Workers' Party of Korea. The CPV sent delegations to the 8th Congress of the Communist Party of the Russian Federation in 2008, the 5th Congress of the Party of Italian Communists in 2008, the 20th Congress of the Communist Party of India in 2008, the 9th Communist Party of India (Marxist) in 2008, the 18th Congress of Communist Party of Greece in 2009, the 9th Congress of the Communist Party of Denmark in 2009, the 18th Congress of the Spanish Communist Party in 2009, the 8th Congress of the Communist Party of Nepal (Marxist–Leninist) in 2009, the 12th Congress of the Communist Party of Brazil in 2009 and that of the Peruvian Communist Party in 2010.

The CPV maintains also friendly relations with Latin American left-wing political parties. A delegation from the CPV participated in the 22nd Meeting of Foro de São Paulo in El Salvador in June 2016.

Electoral history

National Assembly elections

See also 
 Human rights in Vietnam
 Politics of Vietnam
 National Assembly (Vietnam)

Notes

References

Citations

Sources

Books

 
 
 
 
 
 
 
 
 
 
 
 
 
 
 
 
 
 
 
 
 
 
 
 Smith, R.B., "The Foundation of the Indochinese Communist Party, 1929-1930," Modern Asian Studies, vol. 32, no. 4 (October 1998), pp. 769–805. In JSTOR

Journal articles

Reports

News and magazine articles

Websites

External links 
 Communist Party of Vietnam official website 

 
V
1930 establishments in French Indochina
Parties of one-party systems
Far-left political parties
Political parties in Vietnam
V
Political parties established in 1930
Law of Vietnam
1930 establishments in Vietnam
Vietnam
Communist parties in Vietnam
National liberation movements
Nationalist parties in Vietnam
Organizations of the Vietnam War
International Meeting of Communist and Workers Parties